Tau Boötis, Latinised from τ Boötis, is an F-type main-sequence star approximately 51 light-years away in the constellation of Boötes. It is a binary star system, with the secondary star being a red dwarf. As of 1999, an extrasolar planet has been confirmed to be orbiting the primary star. In December 2020, astronomers may have detected, for the first time, radio emissions from a planet beyond the Solar System. According to the researchers: "The signal is from the Tau Boötis system, which contains a binary star and an exoplanet. We make the case for an emission by the planet itself."

Stellar components
The system is a binary. The primary component is a yellow-white dwarf (spectral type F7 V) and secondary is a dim red dwarf (spectral type M2 V). The system is relatively nearby, distance being about 51 light-years. The primary star should be easily visible to the unaided eye under dark skies.

The primary star, Tau Boötis A is a yellow-white dwarf. It is 40 percent more massive than the Sun and thus is somewhat brighter and hotter. It has a radius 1.4 times solar, and is probably about 1.3 billion years old. Since it is more massive than the Sun, its lifespan is shorter—less than 6 billion years. Tau Boötis is the first star apart from the Sun to be observed changing the polarity of its magnetic field. It is also listed as a suspected variable star. The magnetic activity cycle for this star shows a period of 122 days—much shorter than the solar cycle.

Tau Boötis B (with a capital B, as opposed to the planet) is a dim, 11 mag red dwarf orbiting the primary star at a distance of 220 AU (14 arcseconds). One orbit around the primary would take approximately two-and-a-half thousand years to complete.

Planetary system
In 1996 the planet Tau Boötis b was discovered orbiting the primary star by a team of astronomers led by R. Paul Butler. There are also some indications of another planet orbiting the star with a period of roughly 5,000 days; however, this could be due to an instrumental effect or a stellar magnetic activity cycle. Tau Boötis and its planet appear to be tidally locked to each other.

Naming controversy
The planet and its host star was one of the planetary systems selected by the International Astronomical Union as part of NameExoWorlds, their public process for giving proper names to exoplanets and their host star (where no proper name already exists). The process involved public nomination and voting for the new names, and the IAU announced the new names in mid-December 2015. However, the IAU annulled the vote for the system, as the winning names ("Shri Ram Matt" for the star and "Bhagavatidevi" for the planet) were judged not to conform with the IAU rules for naming exoplanets due to the political activities of the namesake people. The names garnered the majority of the votes cast for the system, and also making up a significant proportion of all votes cast as part of the contest.

References

External links
 
 
 
 
 
 
 

Bootis, Tau
Binary stars
Boötes
Bootis, 04
120136
067275
5185
0527
BD+18 2782
M-type main-sequence stars
F-type subgiants
2
Planetary systems with one confirmed planet
F-type main-sequence stars